In These Black Days: A Tribute to Black Sabbath is the name of a six-volume Black Sabbath tribute series, released in the late 1990s as a series of split 7" singles by various artists on Hydra Head Records. 

A double CD compiling all of the songs from the 7"s with additional Black Sabbath covers from other bands associated with Hydra Head Records was planned for years, but has not been released.

In 2013, all six volumes were re-released in a 7×7" box set that is limited to less than 100 copies.

Track listing

Volume 1

Volume 2

Volume 3

Volume 4

Volume 5

Volume 6

Canceled CD
The unreleased double CD compilation was intended to be a split release between Hydra Head and Relapse Records, with additional Sabbath covers provided by Goatsnake, Isis, Agoraphobic Nosebleed, Amber Asylum, and The Dillinger Escape Plan. Goatsnake's cover of "Who Are You" was instead included on a repress of the Dog Days EP; Isis' cover of "Hand of Doom" was included on the Sawblade EP; Amber Asylum's cover of "Black Sabbath" was included on The Supernatural Parlour Collection; The Dillinger Escape Plan's cover of "Paranoid" was included on a reissue of the Under the Running Board EP.

References

External links
In These Black Days: A Tribute to Black Sabbath at Discogs

Black Sabbath tribute albums
1998 compilation albums